In mathematics, the Poincaré metric, named after Henri Poincaré, is the metric tensor describing a two-dimensional surface of constant negative curvature. It is the natural metric commonly used in a variety of calculations in hyperbolic geometry or Riemann surfaces.

There are three equivalent representations commonly used in two-dimensional hyperbolic geometry. One is the Poincaré half-plane model, defining a model of hyperbolic space on the upper half-plane. The Poincaré disk model defines a model for hyperbolic space on the unit disk. The disk and the upper half plane are related by a conformal map, and isometries are given by Möbius transformations.  A third representation is on the punctured disk, where relations for q-analogues are sometimes expressed.  These various forms are reviewed below.

Overview of metrics on Riemann surfaces

A metric on the complex plane may be generally expressed in the form

The length of a curve γ in the complex plane is thus given by 

The area of a subset of the complex plane is given by

where  is the exterior product used to construct the volume form.

A function  is said to be the potential of the metric if

The Laplace–Beltrami operator is given by

The Gaussian curvature of the metric is given by

This curvature is one-half of the Ricci scalar curvature.

Isometries preserve angles and arc-lengths.  On Riemann surfaces, isometries are identical to changes of coordinate: that is, both the Laplace–Beltrami operator and the curvature are invariant under isometries. Thus, for example, let S be a Riemann surface with metric  and T be a Riemann surface with metric .  Then a map

.

Here, the requirement that the map is conformal is nothing more than the statement

that is,

Metric and volume element on the Poincaré plane
The Poincaré metric tensor in the Poincaré half-plane model is given on the upper half-plane H as

This metric tensor is invariant under the action of SL(2,R).  That is, if we write

for  then we can work out that

and

The infinitesimal transforms as

and so

thus making it clear that the metric tensor is invariant under SL(2,R). Indeed,

The invariant volume element is given by

The metric is given by

for 

Another interesting form of the metric can be given in terms of the cross-ratio.

Then the metric is given by

The geodesics for this metric tensor are circular arcs perpendicular to the real axis (half-circles whose origin is on the real axis) and straight vertical lines ending on the real axis.

Conformal map of plane to disk
The upper half plane can be mapped conformally to the unit disk with the Möbius transformation

where w is the point on the unit disk that corresponds to the point z in the upper half plane.  In this mapping, the constant z0 can be any point in the upper half plane; it will be mapped to the center of the disk. The real axis  maps to the edge of the unit disk  The constant real number  can be used to rotate the disk by an arbitrary fixed amount.

The canonical mapping is

which takes i to the center of the disk, and 0 to the bottom of the disk.

Metric and volume element on the Poincaré disk
The Poincaré metric tensor in the Poincaré disk model is given on the open unit disk 

 

by

The volume element is given by

The Poincaré metric is given by

for 

The geodesics for this metric tensor are circular arcs whose endpoints are orthogonal to the boundary of the disk. Geodesic flows on the Poincaré disk are Anosov flows; that article develops the notation for such flows.

The punctured disk model

A second common mapping of the upper half-plane to a disk is the q-mapping

where q is the nome and τ is the half-period ratio:
 .
In the notation of the previous sections, τ is the coordinate in the upper half-plane . The mapping is to the punctured disk, because the value q=0 is not in the image of the map.

The Poincaré metric on the upper half-plane induces a metric on the q-disk

The potential of the metric is

Schwarz lemma
The Poincaré metric is distance-decreasing on harmonic functions. This is an extension of the Schwarz lemma, called the Schwarz–Ahlfors–Pick theorem.

See also
Fuchsian group
Fuchsian model
Kleinian group
Kleinian model
Poincaré disk model
Poincaré half-plane model
Prime geodesic

References
 Hershel M. Farkas and Irwin Kra, Riemann Surfaces (1980), Springer-Verlag, New York. .
 Jurgen Jost, Compact Riemann Surfaces (2002), Springer-Verlag, New York.  (See Section 2.3).
 Svetlana Katok, Fuchsian Groups (1992), University of Chicago Press, Chicago  (Provides a simple, easily readable introduction.)

Conformal geometry
Hyperbolic geometry
Riemannian geometry
Riemann surfaces
Metric